Pas de deux  is a ballet duet in which steps are performed together.

Pas de deux may also refer to:

Ballet
 Pas de Deux (d'Amboise), a ballet by Christopher d'Amboise
 Pas de Deux (Robbins) or Andantino, a ballet by Jerome Robbins
 Tschaikovsky Pas de Deux, a ballet by George Balanchine

Other uses
 Pas de Deux (band), a Belgian band
 Pas de deux (dressage), a performance with two horses
 Pas de deux (film), a 1968 film directed by Norman McLaren
 Pas de deux (Horner), a 2014 double concerto by James Horner
 "Pas de Deux" (Law & Order: Criminal Intent), a television episode
 Pas de Deux (solitaire), a card game